Andrew Hawkins (born 1986) is an American football player.

Andrew or Andy Hawkins may also refer to:

Andrew Hawkins (cricketer) (born 1967), English cricketer
Andy Hawkins (born 1960), American baseball pitcher
Andy Hawkins (American football) (born 1958), retired American football player
Andy Hawkins (musician) (born 1960), American guitarist
Andy Hawkins (music producer) (born 1977), British musician and record producer

See also
Hawkins (name)